Ecthyma( ec·​thy·​ma | \ ek-ˈthī-mə )is a variation of impetigo, presenting at a deeper level of tissue.

It is usually associated with Group A (beta-hemolytic) Streptococcus (abbreviated GAS).

See also
 Ecthyma gangrenosum

References

External links 

Bacterium-related cutaneous conditions